Diphylleia is a group of small herbs in the family Berberidaceae described as a genus in 1803. It is native to the eastern United States and eastern Asia.

Diphylleia grayi, also known as the skeleton flower, has white petals that turn translucent with rain. When dry, they revert to white.

Species
The following species are recognised by World Flora Online:
Diphylleia cymosa Michx. - southern Appalachians from SW Virginia to NW Georgia
Diphylleia grayi F.Schmidt - Cape Sōya in northern Japan
Diphylleia sinensis H.L.Li - China (Gansu, Hubei, Shaanxi, Sichuan, Yunnan)

References

Berberidaceae
Berberidaceae genera
Taxa named by André Michaux